XHMMF-FM is a radio station on 92.3 FM in Mexicali. The station is owned by Grupo Audiorama Baja California and carries its La Bestia Grupera grupera format.

History
XHMMF received its first concession on February 11, 1980. The station had been proposed as early as 1964.

References

Radio stations in Mexicali
Radio stations established in 1980